"Fly" is a song by French-Malian singer Aya Nakamura. It was released as the fourth single from her second studio album Aya on 17 March 2021.

Charts

Certifications

References 

2021 songs
2021 singles
Aya Nakamura songs
Songs written by Aya Nakamura